The Canton of Rennes-Brequigny is a former canton of France, in the Ille-et-Vilaine département. It had 13,259 inhabitants (2012). It was disbanded following the French canton reorganisation which came into effect in March 2015. The canton comprised part of the commune of Rennes.

References

Former cantons of Ille-et-Vilaine
Canton Rennes Brequigny
2015 disestablishments in France
States and territories disestablished in 2015